Ashta Veeratta Stalam (also called Ashtaveertanam or Atta Veeratanam) are the eight temples of Hindu god Shiva, that commemorate his eight acts of valour and fury where he became victorious over demons or divinities. Seven out of these temples are also classified as Paadal Petra Sthalam, the temples of Shiva that are revered in Tevaram (7th century canonical work by the Shaiva Nayanar saints). The presiding deity in all the temples is called Veerateeswarar.

List of temples

Notes

References

External links

Padal Petra Stalam
Ashta Veeratta Stalam
Shiva temples in Cuddalore district